Medlice is a municipality and village in Znojmo District in the South Moravian Region of the Czech Republic. It has about 200 inhabitants.

History
The first written mention of Medlice is from 1285.

References

Villages in Znojmo District